Sea When Absent is the fourth studio album by American indie rock band A Sunny Day in Glasgow. It was released on June 24, 2014 by Lefse Records.

The recording of Sea When Absent was financed through the crowdfunding platform Kickstarter. The album could be streamed through Pitchforks Advance service from June 16 to June 23, 2014.

Recording
While it was widely reported that the members of A Sunny Day in Glasgow were never in the same room while making Sea When Absent, the band has clarified that this was not the case. Band member Ben Daniels said: "I think that's an angle that's kind of over-played, because for most of the recording we were all definitely in the same room. We live in different cities, but we would meet up in Philadelphia to go to the studio together. Then we'd go back to where we lived, and keep working on it, so there was a little bit of both."

Critical reception

Pitchfork accorded Sea When Absent a "Best New Music" designation; reviewer Lindsay Zoladz found that A Sunny Day in Glasgow had produced a more sonically abrasive work than their previous releases, "but without abandoning the ambiance that makes them so distinct."

Track listing

Personnel
Credits are adapted from the album's liner notes.

A Sunny Day in Glasgow
 Ben Daniels
 Annie Fredrickson
 Jen Goma
 Adam Herndon
 Josh Meakim
 Ryan Newmyer

Additional musicians

 David Kain – trumpet
 Joseph Kille – violin
 St. Spanky's Children's Choir for the Deaf – choir vocals

Production

 Ben Daniels – mixing, additional recording
 Jen Goma – additional mixing and recording
 Thomas Kee – mastering
 Josh Meakim – additional mixing and recording
 Jeff Zeigler – recording, additional mixing

Design

 Ben Daniels – photography
 Sabrina Franz – photography
 Annie Fredrickson – photography
 Adam Herndon – design, layout
 Ever Nalens – photography
 James Rickman – photography
 Corey Jacob Williams – photography

Charts

References

External links
 

2014 albums
A Sunny Day in Glasgow albums
Albums recorded in a home studio